It's for Your Own Good is a 2017 Spanish comedy film directed by  and written by Manuel Burque and Josep Gatell which stars José Coronado, Javier Cámara, and Roberto Álamo.

Cast

Release 
Distributed by Buena Vista International, the film was theatrically in Spain on 24 February 2017. It behave well at the domestic box office, opening with a €1.5 million weekend, an grossing a total over €9 million.

See also 
 List of Spanish films of 2017

References

External links 

2017 comedy films
Spanish comedy films
Buena Vista International films
2010s Spanish-language films
Telecinco Cinema films
2010s Spanish films